Maxime Collin (born December 6, 1979) is a Canadian actor and business owner best known for playing the title character in the 1992 film Léolo and Benoit in Matusalem (1993).

Collin was 11 when he was cast for Léolo. He had many roles over the next few years and decided to take less work by age 17, after which he described himself as forgotten. After taking insurance broker training, he went into business as the owner of a car cleaning store.

References

External links

1979 births
Businesspeople from Quebec
Canadian male child actors
Canadian male film actors
Living people
Male actors from Quebec